Wolborough is a village and former civil parish in Devon, England. Today it forms a southern suburb of the large town of Newton Abbot, and is part of Newton Abbot civil parish.

Anciently the village was separate from the town, and Wolborough parish encompassed the surrounding rural area and the southern part of the town.

References 

Newton Abbot
Villages in Devon
Former civil parishes in Devon